Pultenaea glabra, commonly known as smooth bush-pea, is a species of flowering plant in the family Fabaceae and is endemic to eastern New South Wales. It is an erect shrub with glabrous stems, linear to egg-shaped leaves with a concave upper surface, and yellow to red and orange flowers.

Description

Taxonomy and naming
Pultenaea glabra was first formally described in 1864 by George Bentham in Flora Australiensis from specimens collected in the Blue Mountains by Richard Cunningham. The specific epithet (glabra) means "without hair".

Distribution and habitat
Smooth bush-pea grows in swampy places in forest in the higher parts of the Blue Mountains in eastern New South Wales.

Conservation status
This pultenaea is listed as "vulnerable" under the Australian Government Environment Protection and Biodiversity Conservation Act 1999 and the New South Wales Government Biodiversity Conservation Act. The main threats to the species are its restricted distribution, habitat loss, weed invasion and drying of the species' habitat.

References

glabra
Flora of New South Wales
Plants described in 1864
Taxa named by George Bentham